Jan Torsten Jakobsson (born 5 July 1957) is a Swedish former alpine skier who competed in the 1976 and 1980 Winter Olympics.

External links
 sports-reference.com

1957 births
Swedish male alpine skiers
Alpine skiers at the 1976 Winter Olympics
Alpine skiers at the 1980 Winter Olympics
Olympic alpine skiers of Sweden
People from Sollefteå Municipality
Living people
Sportspeople from Västernorrland County
20th-century Swedish people